Rodak or Rodák is a name. Notable people with the name include:
 Leo Rodak (1913–1991), American featherweight boxer
 Marek Rodák (born 1996), Slovak football player
 Mike Rodak (1917–1980), American football player
 Rodak, mother of Ardashir I of Persia

See also